Shooto is a combat sport and mixed martial arts organization that is governed by the Shooto Association and the International Shooto Commission. Shooto was originally formed in 1985, first as a particular fighting system and then in 1989 as a mixed martial arts promotion. It is considered one of the first true mixed martial arts competitions, with its Vale Tudo Japan events being essential to the rise of PRIDE Fighting Championships and the development of modern MMA. Many Japanese MMA fighters had their start at Shooto and the organization still holds both professional and amateur tournaments.

As a fighting system, Shooto is considered a hybrid martial art derived from Shoot wrestling. It is focused on all aspects of fighting: striking, stand-up grappling and ground fighting. Practitioners are referred to as shooters or shootists. Shooto rules have evolved with time, are different depending on the class, Class C and D are amateur and have more restricted rules more similar to their first events, while professional classes are now true mixed martial arts competitions. Shooto weight classes are different from those of the United States Association of Boxing Commissions, which are used by most MMA promotions.

Although modern Shooto is indistinguishable from MMA, in Japan promoters, fighters and fans still see it as its own standalone combat sport. While outside it is mostly seen as a system of MMA promotions, organizing events from amateur grassroots to professional levels.

Etymology
The Japanese word shooto  (修斗 shū to) is derived from the English word "shoot". Although the word is of foreign origin, it is not written in katakana, but rather two kanji:  修斗. Its first kanji means "to practice or train in", and the second kanji is just used for its pronunciation, as its literal meaning is a spoon or ladle.

History
Shooto was established as a "New Martial arts" (Shin-Kakutōgi) in 1985 by Satoru Sayama (the original Tiger Mask), a Japanese professional wrestler trained in shoot wrestling, who wished to create a sport that revolved around a realistic and effective fighting system. Sayama was influenced by his former teacher, legendary pro wrestler Antonio Inoki, who was known for his more realistic style of pro wrestling known as "Strong-style", which mixed various styles of striking martial arts (such as Karate) with Catch Wrestling submission grappling, taught by Karl Gotch. This style eventually evolved into the more developed "Shoot-style wrestling", which was also further influenced by more martial arts such as Kickboxing, Muay Thai, Judo and Sambo. It became very popular in the Japanese professional wrestling circuit, and Sayama would use it as a basis for his new martial art. He also founded his own school named the "Super Tiger Gym" for training and development of this new martial art. After its establishment, New Martial arts was renamed "Shooting" which came from Shoot, a term of professional wrestling meaning a legitimate contest as opposed to a worked match, but this changed to "Shooto" to avoid confusion with Shooting sports. Compared with the other professional wrestling organizations of the time, such as the New Japan Pro-Wrestling and the Universal Wrestling Federation, Shooto was aimed at having no predetermined results. The first amateur event was held in 1986 and the first professional event in 1989. Due the origins in the shoot-style circuit, Shooto is considered part of the "U-Kei" system.

The Shooto organization hosted the Vale Tudo Japan tournament in the summer of 1994. The objective was to create a more rules-free event similar to the Ultimate Fighting Championship in the United States and Vale Tudo in Brazil. The star of the first events was Rickson Gracie, older brother of three-time UFC champion Royce Gracie. Vale Tudo Japan was a smashing success, leading to the popularization of MMA around Japan, and its format and rules were used as a basis for PRIDE Fighting Championships, which would become the world's largest MMA promotion, which many Shootist would join it. Previously to this tournament, Shooto did not feature punches to the face in a ground position, but after seeing effective usage of punching by foreign participants, Sayama decided to incorporate these striking techniques as well as Brazilian jiu-jitsu into shooto.  Vale Tudo Japan events were held annually from 1994 to 1999. In May 2009, it was announced that Vale Tudo Japan would return for the first time in ten years on October 30, 2009.

In 1996 Satoru Sayama left Shooto due to disagreements with the board of directors, and was succeeded by Taro Wakayabayshi. In April 1996, World Shooto, the Shooto Association and the International Shooto Commission were formed. This marked the end of Shooto as a single organization, and turned it into a combat sport with governing bodies. Since establishment of ISC, the champions of Shooto are called "World Champion".

Shooto was brought to America in the late 1980s by top student of Satoru Sayama, Yorinaga Nakamura. He began teaching Shooto at the Inosanto Academy in 1991, and is the instructor of Erik Paulson, Ron Balicki, Dan Inosanto, Larry Hartsell, and many others.

Shooto South America, also known as ShootoBrazil is managed by founder of Nova União mixed martial arts academy, André Pederneiras. Its first event was held in Rio de Janeiro in May 2002.

There has been an ongoing effort, spearheaded by Rich Santoro, to promote Shooto competition into the United States and Canada. He was officially named the Director of the International Shooto Commission - SHOOTO Americas division (the North American branch of the Shooto Association) in 2001.  He has worked with both U.S. event promoters and state officials to spread the Shooto brand of competition throughout North America.  As of 2006 Shooto has taken place in Indiana, Illinois, Ohio, Tennessee, Missouri, Nevada, Hawaii, and Vancouver, British Columbia.  Promoters of Shooto events in North America have been HOOKnSHOOT (one of the first MMA organisations in the United States to allow Women's MMA), The Ironheart Crown, Midwest Fighting, Tennessee Shooto, RSF Shooto Challenge, TUFF-N-UFF, World Freestyle Fighting, SHOOTO Hawaii and Mannidog Productions.

Previous to 2009, Shooto's rules included a knockdown rule giving knocked down fighters an eight-count to recover as well as allowing strikes to the back of the head. Shooto had argued that the potential for a knocked out (and thus unconscious) fighter to receive unnecessary damage while on the ground necessitated the rule, but with Shooto being one of the lone organizations still having the rule, consideration of the potential for injury allowing a knocked down fighter time to recover thus allowing additional blows, and with the original vision of Shooto's founder being a synthesis of striking, throwing and submitting - the rule change was instituted in mid-2008. The disallowment of strikes to the back of the head was done for similar medical reasons.

The long-running Japanese league Shooto and sister organization Vale Tudo Japan live-streamed its first shows on UFC Fight Pass in 2016.  Vale Tudo Japan bouts are contested in a cage instead of Shooto's traditional ring,
Broadcast schedules for both promotions were announced April 20, 2016 during a press conference in Tokyo.
Shooto made its Fight Pass debut Saturday, April 23, with “Fight & Mosh” live from Maihama Amphitheater in Urayasu, Japan. Two world titles were on the line, Masaaki Sugawara made his first defense of the 125-pound belt against Hiromasa Ogikubo, plus Koshi Matsumoto and Yuki Kawana vied for the vacant 155-pound mantle.
Shooto followed that up with events on July 17 and Nov. 12, both took place at Korakuen Hall in Tokyo as well as VTJ in Osaka” June 19 at Osaka Prefectural Gymnasium, and “VTJ 9th” on Sept. 19 which saw the organization return to its birthplace of Chiba prefecture.

In 2019 Shooto entered into a partnership with ONE Championship. Under the terms of the partnership, Shooto champions will have the opportunity to sign a contract with ONE, while their amateur champions will be given an opportunity to train at Evolve MMA for a year.

Techniques and strategies
The aim in a shooto match is to defeat the opponent by a knockout or a submission, but fights can also end in a referee stoppage or by a judge decision. Legal techniques include general grappling, chokeholds, joint locks, kicks, knee strikes, punches, takedowns and throws. Illegal techniques include biting, elbow strikes, eye-gouging, forearm strikes, hair pulling, headbutting, kicking or kneeing the head of a downed opponent, small joint manipulation, strikes to the groin or throat and since September 1, 2008, strikes to the back of the head.

Shooto evolved in parallel with Mixed Martial Arts, including most of its techniques and strategies, to the point that both fighting styles are almost indistinguishable. However, fans, fighters and overseers still see Shooto as its own standalone combat sport.

Fighter classes
Shooto fighters are categorized into four classes.
 Class-D: Amateur (2x2min, Headgear, Special point system)
 Class-C: Amateur (2x3min, Headgear, Special point system)
 Class-C+: Amateur (2x3min)
 Class-B: Pro (2x5min)
 Class-A: Pro (3x5min)

Fighters start out as Class-D or Class-C fighters and enter amateur competitions that Shooto hosts together with the help of local gyms all over Japan. Class-D Shooto does not allow knee strikes to the face or striking on the ground. Class-C Shooto does not allow striking on the ground, but knee strikes to the head are allowed. There are regional championship and once a year the All-Japan amateur championships. Then a fighter can get a Class-B pro license, these fights are 2x5 minute long and use the same rules as Class-A fights. Shooto holds yearly rookie tournaments in each weight class.

When a fighter has gathered enough wins and experience in Class-B he will get awarded with a Class-A license, as a sign that he's part of the elite professional fighters.

Shooto events

Shooto organize most of their events in Japan, although it has organized some amateur tournaments in China.

Shooto consists of a multi-layered system designed to develop fighters from grassroots level, aspirants to professional fighters must start through the organization's amateur events, winning their regional tournaments (spread out throughout all the forty-seven prefectures of Japan) and performing well on the annual All-Japan tournament. As the fighter progress they will graduate from lower classes (Class-D and Class-C) until they are graduated into the professional classes (Class-B and Class-A) and now can compete on Shooto's professional events. In Japan the sport is organized by the Shooto Association, however, the Association doesn't organize directly all events, be them professional or low-level amateur, letting gyms and independent promoters organize it.

The International Shooto Commission on the other hand, works to create Shooto organizations outside Japan. The Commission allows local independent organizations to promote their events under the Shooto name.

Domestically, it broadcasts its events over AbemaTV and Samurai TV. Internationally, it has broadcast over the UFC Fight Pass in the past, and a number of their events are part of the UFC Fight Library. Recently, they have put up their events on YouTube.

In popular culture 

 Manga series All-Rounder Meguru by Hiroki Endo centers around Meguru, a high schooler amateur MMA fighter which fights his way through various Shooto amateur events in order to become a professional.

List of current Shooto champions

Current Shooto world champions

Current Shooto Pacific Rim champions

See also
 List of Shooto Champions
 List of Shooto Events

References

External links
Shooto Japan
Shooto Brasil
Shooto Germany
Shooto Finland
Shooto Italy
Shooto United States

 
Mixed martial arts organizations
Combat sports
Hybrid martial arts
Sports originating in Japan
1985 establishments in Japan